Potamonautes niloticus is a species of freshwater crab in the family Potamonautidae. It is found in the Nile Basin in Egypt, Ethiopia, Rwanda, Sudan, and Uganda. Numerous specimens of P. niloticus are known from Miocene deposits around Lake Albert.

References

Potamoidea
Freshwater crustaceans of Africa
Crustaceans described in 1837
Taxonomy articles created by Polbot
Taxa named by Henri Milne-Edwards